Kevin Cairns may refer to:

 Kevin Cairns (footballer) (1937–2017), English footballer 
 Kevin Cairns (politician) (1929–1984), Australian politician